EchoStar XI, also known as EchoStar 11, is an American geostationary communications satellite which is operated by EchoStar on behalf of Dish Network. It is positioned in Geostationary orbit at a longitude of 110° West, from where it is used to provide direct broadcasting services to the United States.

EchoStar XI was built by SSL, and is based on the LS-1300 satellite bus.

See also

 2008 in spaceflight

References

External links
 Dish Network
 EchoStar

Spacecraft launched in 2008
Spacecraft launched by Zenit and Energia rockets
E11